Canal 10 (call sign LV 80 TV) is an Argentinean television station located in the province of Córdoba. Channel 10 began broadcasting on May 11, 1962.

The station is operated by the National University of Córdoba and currently carries an independent format, plus some local shows and programs from national public broadcaster Televisión Pública, Pakapaka and Encuentro.

Television stations in Argentina
Television channels and stations established in 1962
1962 establishments in Argentina